Ukendt Kunstner (English: 'Unknown Artist') was a Danish hip hop group from Copenhagen, founded in 2012 by rapper Hans Philip, producer Jens Ole Wowk McCoy, alongside singers Rollo and King. They were signed to the label Sony Music Denmark.

The duo started under the name Skørmand before changing it to Ukendt Kunstner. They released their commercial debut single "København" in 2012, taken from their mixtape Hælervarer, and gained widespread fame through their first album Neonlys and its title track. In 2013, they were nominated for "Danish Urban Release" during the Danish Music Awards and in 2014 nominations for P3 Guld for "P3 Talent" and "P3 listening hit". In 2014, they released their follow-up album Forbandede Ungdom.

At Danish Music Awards 2014, they won the prize as "Årets Danske Gruppe", which translates to "Danish Group of the Year". In December 2016, after the release of their third album, Den Anden Side, they announced that they had decided to stop making music together.

Discography

Albums

EPs
2012: Hælervarer, Side A
2012: Hælervarer, Side B

Singles

Discography: Hans Philip

Albums

Singles

Other charting songs

Discography: Jens Ole Wowk McCoy

Albums
2017: Underverden (Original Motion Picture Score) for Darkland a film by Fenar Ahmad
2019: Valhalla (Original Motion Picture Score) for Valhalla a film by Fenar Ahmad

Singles

References

Danish hip hop groups
Danish musical duos